Ayacucho Fútbol Club is a Peruvian football club located in Ayacucho, Peru. Some of its former names are Aurora Miraflores, Olímpico San Luis, Olímpico Somos Peru, Olímpico Aurora Miraflores, Loreto and Inti Gas. As Olímpico Somos Peru, the club won a Second Division title in 2006, and as Inti Gas, the club finished as runner-up in 2008.

History

Olímpico
Olímpico San Luis was promoted to the Second Division in 2000. The following year they changed the club name to Olímpico Somos Peru. In 2004 they won the Second Division and played in the finals of the Copa Perú to gain promotion, however they lost to Deportivo Municipal in the quarter-finals. Beginning in 2006, they officially changed their name to Olímpico Aurora Miraflores.

Real Loreto
In 2007, the club moved their home ground to Iquitos and renamed as Real Loreto FC in order to increase their fanbase. They failed to gain a large amount of support from Iquitos and for 2008 they returned to Lima.

Inti Gas

In 2008, the club received sponsorship from the gas provider Inti Gas. They relocated to Huamanga, Ayacucho but they decided to play their home games in Ica because another Second Division team already had their home ground in Ayacucho and security issues that have risen. They were runners-up of the 2008 Second Division and were promoted to the 2009 First Division. Ayacucho has recently sought to permanently keep the club in its city.

Ayacucho
In 2014, they officially changed their name to Ayacucho FC.

Stadiums
Ayacucho mainly plays their home matches in the Estadio Ciudad de Cumaná located in Ayacucho, Huamanga, Peru. The club's second stadium for home matches is the Estadio Municipal de Huanta (capacity: 10,000) located in Huanta, Peru.

Honours

National

League
Torneo Clausura:
Winners (1): 2020 Fase 2

Peruvian Segunda División:
Winners (2): 2004, 2005
Runner-up (1): 2008

Regional
Liga Provincial de Lima:
Winners (1): 1999 

Liga Distrital de San Luis:
Winners (1): 1999

Under-20 team
Torneo de Promoción y Reserva:
Runner-up (1): 2022

Results

Performance in CONMEBOL competitions
Copa Sudamericana: 4 appearances
2012: First Stage
2013: First Stage
2014: First Stage
2022: Ongoing
Copa Libertadores: 1 appearance
2021: Second Stage

Current squad

Notable players

Managers
 Edgar Ospina (Jan 1, 2009 – Dec 31, 2009)
 José Torres (Jan 1, 2010 – April 19, 2010)
 Edgar Ospina (July 19, 2010 – Dec 31, 2012)
 César Tabárez (Jan 1, 2013 – April 14, 2013)
 Rolando Chilavert (April 15, 2013–14)
 Carlos Fabián Leeb (2014–15)
 Freddy García (2015–)

References

External links
 Club website

Association football clubs established in 2008
Football clubs in Peru
2008 establishments in Peru